The following is a list of most expensive American soccer transfers, which details the highest transfer fees ever paid for players, as well as transfers which set new American transfer records.  The current transfer record was set by the transfer of Christian Pulisic from Borussia Dortmund to Chelsea for $65 million in August 2019.

Highest transfer payments for American players

Highest transfer payments received by American soccer clubs

Historical progression

Highest transfer payments paid by American soccer clubs

References 

Payment
United States
Highest payments
Association football player non-biographical articles